Alois Lutz (1898–1918) was an Austrian figure skater. He invented the Lutz jump. He performed it for the first time in competition in 1913.

References

Austrian male single skaters
1898 births
1918 deaths